Heros: The Sanguine Seven (also known as Heros I: The Sanguine Seven and Heroes: The Tantalizing Trio) is a platform game that was released for DOS, by Jeffrey Fullerton in July 1993. The game features EGA/VGA graphics, PC Speaker sound effects, Sound Blaster FM music tracks, and 360° of smooth parallax scrolling.

Originally self-published by Jeffrey Fullerton, a shareware version called Heroes: The Tantalizing Trio was later published by Safari Software.

The game bears similarities to many other platform games of the time such as Duke Nukem and Cosmo's Cosmic Adventure, but has some distinctive features. The most notable one is the ability to play as seven different "super heroes" each with their own abilities, weaknesses, and strengths.

In June 2005, Jeffrey Fullerton released the full version of Heros: The Sanguine Seven as freeware for personal use. The game can be downloaded free of charge at his homepage.

Plot

A jailbreak has occurred and five of the most notorious outcasts have escaped. These five escapees have eluded authorities successfully, recruited many villains into their army of mass terror and destruction, and have wreaked havoc all over the city of Megalopolis. The villains seem unstoppable, as the police force has failed over and over again to bring the band of bad buddies to justice. As a last resort, a team of super heroes are summoned in an attempt to restore justice in the once proud city of Megalopolis.

Gameplay

The gameplay in Heros is like most platform games. The player's goal is to find the exit on each level while avoiding villains and other hazards. All heroes can jump, shoot, and use their unique special abilities. They may also collect miscellaneous items that are scattered around the levels to obtain points. Every ten levels the player will face one of the five bosses. The game consists of a total of fifty levels in the original version. There are only eleven levels in the Heroes: The Tantalizing Trio shareware version of the game (see below).

Like most platform games, Heros has enemies which will try to put an end to the player's mission. The enemies come in different kinds; some chase the player, some are immobile, and yet others fire projectiles at the player.

On certain levels the player can find fruit which restores a certain amount of the hero's health. Power gems are scarce but important to the completion of the game. Gems increase certain attributes of the heroes, such as their health, ammo, or jump. Gems can only be used once.

The Control Room is the main room in the game. In the control room, the player can use power gems, save the game, view the demo, and select the hero that will attempt the next mission. Games can only be saved when exiting a level and returning to the control room.

When a hero's health drops down to zero, a protective bubble surrounds the hero and a message is relayed to the Control Room demanding assistance. The score will be reset to the score the player had before entering the level. In addition, any power gems that the hero had in his/her inventory are lost forever. Keys are not lost, and are transferred when another hero picks them up. The player must then select another hero to enter the level and pick up the fallen comrade. If all heroes fall, the game ends

The Heroes

The band of heroes consists of seven unique and different heroes. All of them have different strengths, weaknesses, and special abilities. The Flying Squirrel is the leader of the team. He is one of the stronger heroes, and his special ability allows him to travel over great horizontal distances by braking in the air. Rockettress is the only female hero on the team. She has a set of rocket boosters that she can use to propel herself up to high places where under normal circumstances other heroes cannot get to. Gumwad is a hero whose sticky nature enables him to scale up walls. Leadman is a hero who is completely encased in a thick, sturdy suit of lead. He can take much more shots than any other hero, as his health and power both act as health, but his bulky suit really slows him down. The Drip is a man who is in the form of water, and can use his shape shifting power for protection. Spaced Cadet is a time traveler from the future stranded in the present era. He has an immensely powerful ray gun that can kill all normal enemies in one shot. The Flea is very small, making him hard to hit, and enabling him to enter some places that other heroes cannot.

The Supervillains

The supervillains are the main suspects that the police want apprehended and brought to justice. Each supervillain has his/her own special tactics and features. There are five supervillains that the player must fight in Heros; all supervillains can take a fair number of shots and all will drop a key when they fall.

The villains include Hot Head, the first and weakest; Robo Robber, one of the more difficult supervillains as the robotic sphere moves at blinding speeds and is completely airborne; The Count, which uses bats to attack; The Green Thumb, a tiny, hardworking elf-like creature; and The Wild Hare, mastermind of the super villains, and the last enemy of the game.

Release
Jeffrey Fullerton released the initial version of Heros: The Sanguine Seven during July 1993 to local Bulletin Board System across the United States, but due to lack of advertising very few copies of the game were sold. Besides that, the game had no shareware version, and people were unable to play the game before they could buy it.

Some time later, Jeffrey Fullerton contacted Safari Software to distribute his game. Safari agreed to distribute it under the conditions that Fullerton would make some improvements and create a shareware version. In April 1994, the upgraded version, called Heroes: The Sanguine Seven, was released under the Safari label. For the most part the game was unaltered and kept in its original state. The only major differences were that Tomisa Starr enhanced the artwork, a few minor bugs were fixed, and the spelling of "Heros" was changed to "Heroes." Also, a shareware version of the game, called Heroes: The Tantalizing Trio, was released along with the complete game. The shareware version allowed the player to use only 3 heroes, and had 11 levels instead of the 50 levels of the full version.

Safari discontinued the game at the end of 1994.

References

External links
Jeffrey Fullerton's homepage - full game available for download (archived)

Platform games
DOS games
DOS-only games
1993 video games
Freeware games
Video games developed in the United States